The Redick Mansion, also known as the Mayne Mansion and Redick Hall, was located at 3612 North 24th Street in North Omaha, Nebraska. It served as the first home of Omaha University, now known as the University of Nebraska at Omaha, from 1909 through 1917. A five-story tower on the front of the mansion was a notable landmark throughout the area.

Early history
Henry and Mary Meyers built a simple wooden farmhouse along rural North 24th Street in 1875. In 1885 Clifton E. Mayne, a local real estate developer and businessman, bought the house, which was now located in a new suburb called Kountze Place. Using profits from his recent development called Orchard Hill, Mayne grew the house into a 20-room mansion, with a five-story tower and a wide veranda encircling the entire first floor. A large parlor, a dining room and a spacious entry hall greeted guests, along with tall chimneys, exotic woodwork and elegant fixtures throughout the house. In 1889 John I. Redick bought the residence after Mayne fell into financial difficulty. In 1898 the mansion was located across the street from the Trans-Mississippi and International Exposition. John Redick's son, Oak C. Redick, sold the house for $30,000 to the newly formed Municipal University of Omaha in 1907.

Omaha University
Omaha University paid for the building and moved in in 1909, renaming it Redick Hall. The first classes were held there on September 14, 1909, for twenty-six students, nineteen of them graduates of Omaha High School. The building was used for classes and offices, and the adjacent carriage house was used as the science laboratory. The parlor was converted into a chapel and a resting room made available for female students. Faculty for the fledgling university came from the nearby Omaha Presbyterian Theological Seminary.

The campus developed quickly with the addition of Jacobs Gymnasium and Joslyn Hall, as well as a College of Law, all on the original Redick Mansion property. In 1917 the building was sold to a local grain dealer who had it disassembled and moved by train to a resort on Keeley Island on Lake Shetek near Currie, Minnesota where it became the Valhalla Dance Pavilion and Cafe until it burnt down on March 3, 1928.

Omaha University moved to its Dodge Street location starting in 1936. Today the Redick Mansion property is the site of Omaha Public Schools' King Science and Technology Magnet Middle School. It sits across the street from Kountze Park.

See also
 History of Omaha

References

History of North Omaha, Nebraska
Houses completed in 1875
University of Nebraska Omaha
Demolished buildings and structures in Omaha, Nebraska
Houses in Omaha, Nebraska
Towers in Nebraska
University and college dormitories in the United States
Buildings and structures demolished in 1917